Duclair is a commune in the Seine-Maritime department in the Normandy region in northern France. A breed of duck is named after the town; the canard Duclair is black with a white bib.

Geography
The river Austreberthe joins the Seine at Duclair. There is a ferry to Berville-sur-Seine on the south bank of the Seine.

Heraldry

Population

Places of interest
 The church of St. Denis, dating from the twelfth century.
 Traces of a feudal castle.
 Remains of a 13th-century presbytery.
 The Château du Taillis, dating from medieval times.
 The eighteenth-century Château du Vaurouy.
 La Cour-du-Mont manor house with parts dating from the thirteenth century.
 A seventeenth-century chapel.

Notable people
 Musician Pierre Villette (1926–1998), was born here.

Twin towns
 Ronnenberg, Germany

Bibliography
 Francis Aubert, Duclair, un regard sur le passé, Duclair, 2002 
 Ariane Duclert, "Le Caneton à la rouennaise, spécialité de Duclair", Pays de Normandie 
 Gilbert Fromager, Le Canton of Duclair à l'aube du XXe, Duclair, 1986

See also
Communes of the Seine-Maritime department

References

External links

Official website of Duclair

Communes of Seine-Maritime